Libby Black (born in 1976, Toledo, Ohio) is an American contemporary artist working primarily in drawing, painting, and sculpture. Black lives and works in Berkeley California.

Education
Black holds a B.F.A. in Painting from Cleveland Institute of Art, (1999) and an M.F.A. in Painting and Drawing from the California College of the Arts (2001).

Work and Themes
Through painting, drawing and sculptural installation, Blacks work explores the course of her personal history and broader cultural contexts, examining the intersection of feminism, LGBTQ+ identity, politics, consumerism, notions of value, and desire.

Black's sculptural representations are life sized re-creations of objects which she makes from paper, hot glue, and acrylic paint. In some exhibitions she arranges her sculptures of domestic objects, books, magazines, handbags, and shoes into still life arrangements, creating installations blending the real and the imaginary. Her two-dimensional paintings and drawings are based on imagery gathered from various sources such as fashion magazines, newspapers, and books.

Exhibitions

Solo
2001 “The Best of the Best,” a.o.v., San Francisco, CA.
2003 “Louis Vuitton,” Manolo Garcia Gallery, San Francisco, CA.
2003 “BENZ,” San Francisco Arts Commission, San Francisco, CA.
2005 “Caught Up In The Moment,” Heather Marx Gallery, San Francisco, CA.
2007 “The Past is Never Where You Think You Left It,” Heather Marx Gallery, San Francisco, CA.
2008 “In Between Things,” University of Georgia, Broad Street Gallery, Athens, GA.
2009 “Timeless,” Charlie James Gallery, Los Angeles, CA.
2010 “Be Here Now,” Marx & Zavattero, San Francisco, CA.
2010 “If Nothing Else Matters,” PEEL, Houston, TX.
2010 “Work Out,” San Jose Institute of Contemporary Art, San Jose, CA.
2012 “Nothing Lasts Forever,” Marx & Zavattero, San Francisco, CA
2015 “There's No Place Like Home,” Joshua Liner Gallery, New York, NY
2016 “A Light That Never Goes Out,” Gallery 16, San Francisco, CA
2018 “Little Girl Blue,” Guerrero Gallery, San Francisco, CA

Group
2001: “Memory and History of Place,” Euphart Museum of Art, Los Altos, CA.
2001: “Belief System,” The Luggage Store, San Francisco, CA.
2002: “Openings,” San Francisco Arts Commission, San Francisco, CA.
2002: “Rolex,” Musee D'Honneur Minuscule, New Langton Arts, San Francisco, CA.
2004: “2004 California Biennial,” Orange County Museum of Art, Newport Beach, CA.
2004: “The Hunt: Ritual and Narrative,” Sun Valley Center for the Arts, Sun Valley, ID.
2005: “Bay Area Now 4,” Yerba Buena Center for the Arts, San Francisco, CA.
2005: “The Superfly Effect,” Jersey City Museum, Jersey City, NJ.
2005: “The Real World,” Kala Institute Gallery, Berkeley, CA.
2006: “Strictly Graphite,” College of Marin Art Gallery, Kentfield, CA.
2006: “Smoke and Mirrors: Deception in Contemporary Art,” Visual Arts Gallery, University of Alabama at Birmingham, Birmingham, AL
2007: “GRAPHIC: New Bay Area Drawing,” di Rosa Preserve, Napa, CA.
2007: “Artist of Invention: A Century of CCA,” Oakland Museum of California, Oakland, CA.
2008: “Art on Paper 2008,” Weatherspoon Art Museum, Greensboro, NC.
2009: “Tigersprung: Obscure Couture,” The McKinney Avenue Contemporary, Dallas, TX.
2010: “New Art for a New Century: Contemporary Acquisitions 2000-2010,” Orange County Museum of Art, Newport Beach, CA.
2011: “New Image Sculpture,” McNay Art Museum, San Antonio, TX.
2011: “Queer States,” Visual Arts Center, University of Texas, Austin, TX.
2012: “Simulacrum,” Columbus College of Art and Design, Columbus, OH. 
2013: “Faux Real,” Laguna Art Museum, Laguna Beach, CA.
2014:“The Stuff of Legends,” Grey Matter, Dallas, TX.
2014: “Pencils Down,” Palo Alto Art Center, Palo Alto, CA.
2015: “Misappropriations: New Acquisitions,” Orange County Museum of Art, Newport Beach, CA.
2016: “Quiet Please: The Mental Game of Art and Tennis,” Berkeley Art Center, Berkeley, CA.
2017: “Sanctuary City: With Liberty and Justice for Some,” San Francisco Arts Commission, San Francisco, CA.
2017: “With Liberty and Justice for Some,” Berkeley Art Center, Berkeley, CA.
2017: “Detritus,” San Jose Institute of Contemporary Art, San Jose, CA.
2017: “Pulped Fictions,” The Torrance Museum, Torrance, CA.
2018: “California Love,” Galerie Droste, Wuppertal, Germany.
2018: “Vanity of Earthly Achievements,” Orth Contemporary, Tulsa, OK.
2018: “Superset,” Fused, San Francisco CA.
2018: “Art Is Where The Heart Is,” Galerie LJ, Paris, France.
2019: “Closer Look: Intimate-Scale Sculpture from the Permanent Collection,” Orange County Museum of Art, Santa Ana, CA.
2019: EPOCH: Libby Black, Josephine Taylor, and Taravat Talepasand, Gallery 16, San Francisco, CA.

Publications

Publications with contributions by Black
2004 California Biennial. New Port Beach: Orange County Museum of Art, 2005. 
Bay Area Now 4. San Francisco: Yerba Buena Center for the Arts, 2006, pages 16–17.
Deluxe: How Luxury Lost Its Luster, by Dana Thomas. London: penguin press, 2007, page 170. 
Artist of Invention: A Century of CCA, San Francisco: California College of the Arts, 2007. 
New Image Sculpture, by Eleanor Heartney, and Rene Paul Barilleaux. San Antonio: McNay Art Museum, 2011, pages 32–39. 
Beautiful Decay, Book 9: The Seven Deadly Sins, by Amir H Fallah. Los Angeles: Beautiful/Decay, 2012. 
One Painting a Day,by Timothy Callaghan. Beverly: Quarry Books, 2013. 
Boxed: A Visual History and the Art of Boxing, by Franklin Sirmans. New York: Damiani/Paul Kasmin Gallery, 2014, pages 64–65. 
Quiet Please: The Mental Game of Art and Tennis, by Ann Trinca. Berkeley: Berkeley Art Center, 2016, pages 1–20.
Much Love and Respect. San Francisco: Gallery 16, 2019.
Find Your Artistic Voice, by Lisa Congdon. San Francisco: Chronicle Books, 2019, pages 86–91

Collections
Black's work is held in the following public and private collections:
Oakland Museum of California, Oakland, CA.
Orange County Museum of Art, Newport Beach, CA.
Pier 24 Photography, San Francisco, CA.
The West Collection, Philadelphia, PA.

Awards
2020 Marcus Early Career Research Award

References

1976 births
Living people
20th-century American artists
21st-century American artists
People from Berkeley, California
California College of the Arts alumni
20th-century American women artists
21st-century American women artists